Althorne is a village and civil parish in Essex, England. The village is in the district of Maldon district and in the parliamentary constituency of Maldon & East Chelmsford. The village has its own Parish Council.

The civil parish has a population of 1,159.

Althorne is on the Dengie peninsula, about 5 km (3 miles) north-west of Burnham-on-Crouch.
The village of Althorne is connected to London, by the Southminster Branch Line, operated by Abellio Greater Anglia, which links Wickford to London Liverpool Street Station. The railway station is Althorne railway station, though the station itself is cut adrift from the main village, only accessible from a long and steep track leading up to the edge of Althorne. There are no A roads close to the village – the main roads being the B1010 to Burnham and the B1018 road from Maldon to nearby Southminster.

Transport 
Transport in Althorne includes a train station run by Abellio Greater Anglia and a bus service that stops nearby, the 331/32 to Chelmsford.

Governance
An electoral ward of the same name exists. The population of this ward at the 2011 Census was 4,128.

Etymology

The name Althorne has an unusual meaning in Old English, translating as '(place at) the burnt thorn-tree'. The name is composed of the words æled ('burnt') and thorn ('thorn-tree'). The earliest known recording of the village was in 1198 as Aledhorn.

Notable people
 Phillip Scott Burge moved to Althorne just before World War 1. He became one of the top British fighter aces, with 11 enemy kills between March and July 1918. He was killed when he was shot down over Seclin, France on 24 July 1918.
 Mark Lubbock (1898–1986), British conductor and composer of operetta and light music, lived with his wife, the writer Bea Howe (1898–1992), at The Old Forge, Althorne, for many years from the 1940s onward.
 John McVicar (1940–2022) convicted armed robber and journalist, was living in a caravan in Althorne at the time of his death.
 Hilda Ormsby (1877–1943), British academic and geographer, died in Althorne.
 Harrison Scott (born 1996), British racing driver, was born in Althorne.

Bridgemarsh Marina

The Marina is approximately one to two miles from the village and close to Althorne Railway Station. It is reached by Bridgemarsh Lane, an unserviced road. The Marina is situated on Althorne Creek. On the south side of the creek is Bridgemarsh Island.

References

External links

 Althorne
 Information and photographs of Althorne village
The history of Althorne 

Villages in Essex
Maldon District